Chennarayunipalle is a village in Anantapur district of the   Indian state of Andhra Pradesh. It is located in Bukkaraya Samudram mandal.

Geography 
Chennarayunipalle  is located at  14°42'36.1" N  77°40'42.5". E. Neelampalli is the gram panchayat of Chennarayunipalle village.

Demographics 
According to the Indian census, 2011, the demographic details of Chennarayunipalle Village is as follows:

Area :  139 hectares

Total population: 50

House Holds: 11

village code of Chennarayunipalle village is 595072.

See also
 List of census towns in Andhra Pradesh

References
 
 

Villages in Anantapur district